Hamisi Abdallah (born 28 October 1987) is a Tanzanian cricketer. He played in the 2014 ICC World Cricket League Division Five tournament.

References

External links
 

1987 births
Living people
Tanzanian cricketers